Graham Price MBE (born 24 November 1951 in Moascar, Egypt) is a former Welsh rugby union player, who was a member of the famous Pontypool RFC front row known as the "Viet Gwent".

Early life 
Graham Price was born in Moascar, Egypt, on 24 November 1951. He was brought up in Pontypool, where he was educated at West Monmouth School. He studied civil engineering at UWIST, part of the University of Wales in Cardiff.

Rugby career

Pontypool 

He joined Pontypool after leaving school, and played at tight-head prop. With Bobby Windsor and Charlie Faulkner he became part of the legendary front row, also known as the "Viet Gwent" (a play on Viet Cong) and immortalised in song by Max Boyce.

Wales caps 
He made his debut for Wales national rugby union team in the 1975 Five Nations Championship against France at the Parc des Princes in Paris. The game featured six players earning their first cap, and the entire Pontypool front line. Wales won by 25–10, their biggest victory over the French since 1909, and the try was subsequently voted the fourth best try ever by a Welsh player. The BBC’s commentator of the match Nigel Starmer-Smith memorably said of Price’s try at the time ‘They will never believe it in Pontypool’. Grand Slams followed for the Wales team in 1976 and 1978.

British Lion 
Price played as a prop in a record 12 successive tests for the British and Irish Lions, touring New Zealand in 1977. The front line in that tour was dominated by the "Viet Gwent" players, including Price. During a test match against Australia, he suffered a broken jaw after a punch by Steve Finnane. Price had to eat liquidised food for six weeks, and wore dentures for the following 40 years until replaced by implants in 2015. He returned for the South Africa in 1980 and made his final international appearances in the New Zealand in 1983 at the age of 31. He had played in every match of all three tours. His record of 12 appearances for a prop for the British and Irish Lions is not expected to be broken.

Outside rugby 
In 2012 Price made a cameo appearance as himself in an episode of the UK comedy drama Stella.

Recognition
Price was appointed a Member of the Order of the British Empire (MBE) in the 2007 Birthday Honours for services to rugby union in Wales.

References

Further reading
Graham Price (1984) Price of Wales (Willow Books) 

1951 births
Living people
British & Irish Lions rugby union players from Wales
Members of the Order of the British Empire
Rugby union players from Pontypool
Rugby union props
Welsh rugby union players
Wales international rugby union players
Pontypool United RFC players
Pontypool RFC players
Barbarian F.C. players
Alumni of Cardiff University
People educated at West Monmouth School